The Myeik dialect, also known as Beik in Burmese, Mergui and Merguese in English, and Marit (มะริด) in Thai, is a divergent dialect of Burmese, spoken in Myeik, the second largest town in Tanintharyi Region, the southernmost region of Myanmar. Myeik shares many commonalities with the Tavoyan dialect, although there are substantial differences especially with regard to phonology.

Phonology

Consonants
Myeik possesses 27 consonant phonemes:

Unlike Standard Burmese, the Myeik dialect does not have any preaspirated consonants.

Mergui Archipelago

Vowels
The Myeik dialect has three types of vowels: plain, nasalized and glottalized, with each type having seven vowels.

Notes

References

Burmese language